The 1958–59 AHL season was the 23rd season of the American Hockey League. The Eddie Shore Award was first awarded to the "Defenceman of the year". Six teams played 70 games each in the schedule. The Buffalo Bisons finished first overall in the regular season. The Hershey Bears won their second consecutive Calder Cup championship.

Final standings
Note: GP = Games played; W = Wins; L = Losses; T = Ties; GF = Goals for; GA = Goals against; Pts = Points;

Scoring leaders

Note: GP = Games played; G = Goals; A = Assists; Pts = Points; PIM = Penalty minutes

 complete list

Calder Cup playoffs
First round
Buffalo Bisons defeated Rochester Americans 4 games to 1.
Hershey Bears defeated Cleveland Barons 4 games to 3.
Finals
Hershey Bears defeated Buffalo Bisons 4 games to 2, to win the Calder Cup. 
 list of scores

All Star Classic
The 6th AHL All-Star Game was played on January 15, 1959, at the Hershey Sports Arena, in Hershey, Pennsylvania. The defending Calder Cup champions Hershey Bears won 5-2 versus the AHL All-Stars.

Trophy and award winners
Team awards

Individual awards

See also
List of AHL seasons

References
AHL official site
AHL Hall of Fame
HockeyDB

American Hockey League seasons
2